Timber Hill is a summit in Vernon County in the U.S. state of Missouri.

Timber Hill is an isolated knob that is located just southeast of the confluence of the Marmaton River with the Little Osage River. The community of Horton is about four miles to the west on US Route 71.

Variant names were "Brushy Mound", "Letiembre Hill", "Tiembre Hill", and "Timbered Hill". "Timber" is a corruption of Letiembre, the French surname of Henry M. Letiembre, a pioneer citizen.

References

Landforms of Vernon County, Missouri
Hills of Missouri